Anne-Marie Rouchon (born 26 January 1938) is a French former professional tennis player. Before getting married in the mid-1960s she competed under her maiden name Anne-Marie Larue.

Rouchon grew up in the town of Saint-Briac-sur-Mer and trained in nearby Saint-Lunaire.

Active during the 1960s and 1970s, Rouchon featured in several editions of the French Championships (later French Open). In 1962 she had a win over 15th-seed Pilar Barril to make the third round for the only time.

Rouchon was a national coach for the French Tennis Federation.

References

External links
 

1938 births
Living people
French female tennis players
Sportspeople from Ille-et-Vilaine